Shirley is a town in the Metropolitan Borough of Solihull, in the West Midlands, England. Historically part of Warwickshire, neighbouring districts include Shirley Heath, Sharmans Cross, Solihull Lodge, Monkspath,Cheswick Green Cranmore and the Hall Green district of Birmingham.

History
The earth works can still be seen from the North Worcestershire Path which commences in Aqueduct Road, Majors Green.

Shirley was part of the Manor of Ulverlei (now Olton) until the establishment of Solihull in the 12th or 13th century after which it became part of the parish of Solihull. Shirley developed slowly as a small village on Stratford Road, called Shirley Street through the settlement. Between 1725 and 1872, Stratford Road was a turnpike road, and the ease of travel along this from Birmingham and Shirley's remoteness attracted sporting activity in the form of bull baiting cockfighting (reputedly at the Plume of Feathers pub) and pugilism. These activities encouraged the church authorities to start building St James Church in 1831, subsequently enlarged in 1882. Finally, in 1893, Shirley became its own ecclesiastical parish. Shirley School which was in School Road until the 1970s was built in 1833.

Shirley grew rapidly in the late 19th century and early 20th century, as people moved out of Birmingham, helped by the opening of the railway in 1908 as a Great Western route from Snow Hill railway station to Stratford upon Avon and on to Cheltenham. For a hundred years from the mid-19th century, Shirley had a racecourse, and this was supplemented by a public lido in Sansome Road, the Odeon Cinema on Stratford Road and the public library in Church Road, all in the 1930s.

The expansion of Shirley resumed after the Second World War and has continued apace in the recent time.

Shirley also had its own council and council house. However, with the rise of Solihull, it became managed underneath the Solihull Council, becoming two district wards: Shirley and Shirley South; the council house has since been demolished.

Shirley was struck by an F0/T1 tornado on 23 November 1981, as part of the record-breaking nationwide tornado outbreak on that day. The tornado later moved out over Solihull town centre.

In the north of Shirley is a district known as Robin Hood. Contrary to popular local belief, this is not believed by historians to be due to a connection with the English folk hero Robin Hood, but is instead due to a misreading of the original name of the area 'Robin's Wood'. The misread name was adopted by a local public house, and eventually other landmarks in the area such as a farm, a traffic island, a golf course and the Robin Hood Cemetery, eventually becoming the official name for the area.

Retail

There are many shops and businesses in the area, mainly centred along the A34 Stratford Road. Shirley has a high proportion of independent retailers and charity stores.

Along Stratford Road, there are many restaurants and other eateries, including Cafe Shirley (German and English food) and Nando's. Pedestrianisation of the high street encouraged the local eateries to have outside dining. Shirley is also home to Red Kite Cycles - the largest independent bike shop in the Birmingham/Solihull area.

There are also many well-known supermarkets that are accessible down Stratford Road which include Sainsbury's, Aldi and Iceland. Morrisons had a store in the town centre which was acquired with the business of Safeway. However this closed in 2019 and is currently awaiting redevelopment. An application to build a seven storey retirement home on the site was rejected by planners in April 2022. 

The 'New Heart for Shirley' was opened in May 2015. Building work on further residential properties are still continuing. Parkgate is advertised as a Mixed-use Development and offers various shops, restaurants and other services such as a gym and the local library.

To the south of the high street (Stratford Road, A34), there are two retail parks; one of which is listed as 'Solihull Gate Retail Park', which has shops including retail outlets Argos, Boots and Smyths; DIY stores B&Q and Homebase; and electrical store Currys. Cranmore Retail/Business Park is mainly DIY (Such as Screwfix) and tool hire.

Along the A34 there are many car dealerships such as Renault, Ford, Jaguar, BMW, Audi and Land Rover as well as a combined Ferrari and Maserati dealership. A new Peugeot car dealership is currently being considered on the same stretch of road.

There are also plans to develop a large industrial park on Blackford Road side of Dog Kennel Lane, occupying the TRW site.

Education
The only secondary school physically in Shirley is Light Hall School. However Tudor Grange Academy, Alderbrook School, St Peter's School in Solihull and Langley School in Olton have catchment areas that cover parts of Shirley. Tudor Grange became an academy in 2011 and now has a Sixth Form, joining St Peter's Sixth Form. Additionally, the Sixth Form College, Solihull and Solihull College are also major local centres for further education as well as Stratford-upon-Avon College via rail links.

Mill Lodge, Shirley Heath, Hasluck's Green, Peterbrook, Sharman's Cross, Woodlands, Streetsbrook, Blossomfield, Burman, Tudor Grange Primary Academy (Previously named St James's C:E) and Our Lady of the Wayside R.C. are all local primary and infant schools that serve pupils in the Shirley area.

Leisure

Shirley has a public library and park, and some small patches of woodland at Bills Wood and Palmers Rough. There is also the nearby Stratford-upon-Avon Canal which provides a walking route into the Warwickshire countryside.
There are several pubs in the area, the most prominent being the Saracens Head and the Plume of Feathers, in the centre of Shirley. Others close by include the Colebrook, the Red Lion, the Pump House, the Woodmans Rest, along with two micro pubs the Shaking Hand & the Craft Inn. Shirley has an active Round Table which organises community events such as the annual beer festival and the donkey derby.

Solihull town centre is a 15-minute walk and bus ride away.

Religion
Our Lady of the Wayside RC church contains one of Elisabeth Frink's Risen Christ sculptures as well as art by Walter Ritchie.

St James Church is the Church of England parish church for the town.

Also on Stratford Road (A34) is Shirley Baptist and Shirley Methodist Churches.

Transport
There are train services to Birmingham Moor Street, Birmingham Snow Hill and on to Stourbridge Junction in one direction and to Henley-in-Arden and Stratford-upon-Avon in the other direction from Shirley railway station, which is located in Haslucks Green Road.

The North Warwickshire Line from Shirley railway station currently only runs as far as Stratford upon Avon railway station; however, the line was a mainline continuing via Honeybourne railway station (which is on the Cotswold Line) as the Honeybourne Line to Cheltenham Spa.

Shirley is also served by several bus routes, including the 5, 6, 31, 49, and 76, all operated by National Express West Midlands which all stop on the Stratford Road in the town centre. Other services that operate in Shirley include the A4, A5 and X20.

Notable people
Ernest Henry "Chinese" Wilson, the notable plant collector and writer, was brought up in Shirley where his parents ran a floristry business.

Mandy Rice-Davies lived in Blenheim Road, Shirley, and attended Sharmans Cross Junior School during the 1950s before moving to London prior to the Profumo affair.

Martin Johnson England RFU Manager, Captain of the England 2003 Rugby Union World Cup Team, lived in Solihull Road and attended Sharmans Cross Junior School.

Richard Hammond BBC Top Gear and TV presenter / journalist, attended Sharmans Cross Junior School.

Ossie Wheatley, cricketer (Glamorgan and England), lived in Shirley in the 1950s while attending first Shirley College, a small private boys preparatory school at the end of Bills Lane Shirley, and then King Edward's School, Birmingham.

Paul Farbrace, former cricketer (Kent and Middlesex) and England assistant coach, now Warwickshire Sport Director lives in Shirley.

References

External links 
Photos from 1950s 1960s
St James Church

Areas of the West Midlands (county)
Solihull